Blidingia is a genus of green algae in the family Kornmanniaceae.

References

Ulvales
Ulvophyceae genera